Bukit Gantang (Jawi: بوكيت ڬنتڠ) is a mukim and parliament constituency in Larut, Matang and Selama District, Perak, Malaysia.

Bukit Gantang (as with Batu Kurau) is famous for its durian orchard. One of the longest train tunnels in Malaysia could also be found in this hilly area.

See also
2007 Bukit Gantang bus crash
Bukit Gantang by-election, 2009

 

Larut, Matang and Selama District
Mukims of Perak